Clinidium howdenorum is a species of ground beetle in the subfamily Rhysodinae. It was described by R.T. & J.R. Bell in 1985. It is named after Anne and Henry Howden, the collectors of the type series. The holotype measures  in length.

References

Clinidium
Beetles of South America
Insects of Trinidad and Tobago
Endemic fauna of Trinidad and Tobago
Beetles described in 1985